Karkamış, formerly Carablus, is a municipality and seat of Karkamış District of Gaziantep Province in Turkey, next to the site of ancient Carchemish. It is inhabited by Turkmens of the Barak tribe and Arabs and had a population of 2,434 in 2022.

It is a border checkpoint on the road to Jarabulus in Syria.

History
What is now the present-day town of Karkamış was essentially a constituent neighborhood of the town Jarabulus known as Şeyhavi. Upon the formation of the Syria–Turkey border, which followed the railroad running through the town, this neighborhood was isolated from the rest. The newly-isolated settlement was initially renamed to Cerablus in 1928 after the main town, Barak in 1946 after a Turkmen tribe found in the region, and lastly Karkamış after the ancient town Carchemish.

Geography 
The Euphrates runs east of Karkamış southward into Syria. At this place, a railway bridge of  that was built between 1911 and 1913 by German engineers as part of the Istanbul-Baghdad Railway, crosses the river parallel to the border line.

Archeology

In March 2011, the Turkish military base which included the ruins of Karkemish was cleared of mines. Archaeologists from Italy and Turkey began excavations, still ongoing, in the ancient town in September 2011.

The site is crossed by the Syria–Turkey border. A Turkish military base has been built after 1920 on the Karkemish acropolis and Inner Town, and access to the acropolis is still restricted. Most of the Outer Town lies in Syrian territory.

Karkemish has always been well known to scholars because of several references to it in the Bible (Jer. 46:2; 2 Chr. 35:20; Isa. 10:9) and in Egyptian and Assyrian texts. However, its location was identified only in 1876 by George Smith.

The site was excavated by the British Museum, 1878-1881 by Patrick Henderson, 1911 by D. G. Hogarth and R. C. Thompson, and from 1912 to 1914 by C. L. Woolley, and T. E. Lawrence ("Lawrence of Arabia"). Excavations were interrupted in 1914 by World War I, resumed in 1920 with Woolley and then ended with the Turkish War of Independence. These expeditions uncovered substantial remains of the Neo-Hittite and Neo-Assyrian periods, including defensive structures, temples, palaces, and numerous basalt statues and reliefs with Luwian hieroglyphic inscriptions.

Following the completion in March 2011 of mine clearing operations on the Turkish portion of the site, archaeological work was resumed in September 2011 by a Turco-Italian joint archaeological expedition under the direction of Prof. Nicolò Marchetti of the University of Bologna.

References

Syria–Turkey border crossings
Populated places in Gaziantep Province